Mirage bowl may refer to:
Mirage Bowl (college football), a series of annual college football games played in Tokyo, Japan, later renamed the Coca-Cola Classic 
An optical illusion device using a parabolic reflector